Red friars may refer to:

 The Trinitarian Order, a Roman Catholic religious order, also known as the Mathurins, founded in 1198. 
 The Order of The Red Friars, a Duke University secret society founded in 1913 and disbanded in 1971.